Kate Crossan (also has performed under the name Cait agus Sean, meaning Kate and John) is an Irish singer and composer.

Crossan first gained notice with a band called Kitty's Kitchen. She now uses arrangements of the acoustic guitar, piano, flute, uilleann pipes, and violin.
She released a solo CD Away... in November 2014

Selected discography 

 Felicia's Journey Soundtrack (November 1999) – Kate Crossan sings on the four followings tracks (2, 5, 12, 14) and strongly participates to the melancholic mood of this film :

 "Titles"
 "History"
 "Lost Child"
 "Rest in Peace" [film ending]

 Voice of the Celtic Heart (2001) – with Oliver Schroer
 "As I Roved Out"
 "Carrickfergus"
 "Bonny Portmore"
 "Galway Bay"
 "My Lagan Love"
 "Flower of Magherally"
 "Danny Boy"
 "Come by the Hills"
 "Siúl a Rún"
 "I Know Where I'm Going"
 "Bheir Mí"

 Voice of Comfort: Celtic Songs of Love & Life (2002) – under performing name Cait agus Sean (meaning Kate and John in Irish). The sleeve notes read 'Find peace and inspiration in these Celtic songs of love and life as sung by Kate Crossan – Instrumentation includes fiddle, Celtic flute & whistles, bodhran, djembe, percussion, guitar, harp, violin & keyboards'.

 "Rivers and Dreams"
 "Casadh An tSugain"
 "Fire on the Hearth"
 "Flying"
 "The Mist of Years"
 "An Mhaighdean Mhara"
 "Love Came Lightly"
 "In Love Forever"
 "Castle of Dromore"
 "Siun Ni Dhuibhir"
 "Be My Music"

 Away... (November 2014)

 "Siúl a ghrá"
 "My Lovely Irish Rose"
 "The Coolin"
 "The Franklin Expedition"
 "Fair Randalstown"
 "The Old Canal"
 "Ardaigh Cuain"
 "My Charming Buachaill Roe"
 "Kitty Bawn O'Brien"
 "The Blackbirds"
 "An Fharraige Chiúin"
 "The Old Cross of Ardboe (The Emigrant's Farewell)"

References 

Irish women singers
Irish folk singers
Irish pop singers
Living people
New-age musicians
Celtic fusion musicians
Year of birth missing (living people)